Quercus rupestris is a small tree species in the beech family Fagaceae. It is placed in subgenus Cerris, section Cyclobalanopsis.

This is a small tree species, growing to 5–6 m, which appears to be endemic to Vietnam, where it may be called sồi vùng đá  There are no known sub-species.

References

External links
 
 

rupestris
Endemic flora of Vietnam
Flora of Indo-China
Trees of Vietnam
Taxa named by Aimée Antoinette Camus